Norris Beach is a summer village in Alberta, Canada. It is located on the southern shore of Pigeon Lake, along Highway 13.

Demographics 

In the 2016 Census of Population conducted by Statistics Canada, the Summer Village of Norris Beach had a population of 38 living in 19 of its 94 total private dwellings, a  change from its 2011 population of 46.

See also 
List of communities in Alberta
List of summer villages in Alberta
List of resort villages in Saskatchewan

References

External links 

1988 establishments in Alberta
Summer villages in Alberta